Logology is the study of all things related to science and its practitioners—philosophical, biological, psychological, societal, historical, political, institutional, financial. The term "logology" is back-formed from the suffix "-logy", as in "geology", "anthropology", etc., in the sense of the "study of science".
The word "logology" provides grammatical variants not available with the earlier terms "science of science" and "sociology of science", such as "logologist", "logologize", "logological", and "logologically". The emerging field of metascience is a subfield of logology.

Origins
The early 20th century brought calls, initially from sociologists, for the creation of a new, empirically based science that would study the scientific enterprise itself. The early proposals were put forward with some hesitancy and tentativeness. The new meta-science would be given a variety of names, including "science of knowledge", "science of science", "sociology of science", and "logology".

Florian Znaniecki, who is considered to be the founder of Polish academic sociology, and who in 1954 also served as the 44th president of the American Sociological Association, opened a 1923 article:
[T]hough theoretical reflection on knowledge—which arose as early as Heraclitus and the Eleatics—stretches... unbroken... through the history of human thought to the present day... we are now witnessing the creation of a new science of knowledge [author's emphasis] whose relation to the old inquiries may be compared with the relation of modern physics and chemistry to the 'natural philosophy' that preceded them, or of contemporary sociology to the 'political philosophy' of antiquity and the Renaissance. [T]here is beginning to take shape a concept of a single, general theory of knowledge... permitting of empirical study.... This theory... is coming to be distinguished clearly from epistemology, from normative logic, and from a strictly descriptive history of knowledge."

A dozen years later, Polish husband-and-wife sociologists Stanisław Ossowski and Maria Ossowska (the Ossowscy) took up the same subject in an article on "The Science of Science" whose 1935 English-language version first introduced the term "science of science" to the world. The article postulated that the new discipline would subsume such earlier ones as epistemology, the philosophy of science, the psychology of science, and the sociology of science. The science of science would also concern itself with questions of a practical character such as social and state policy in relation to science, such as the organization of institutions of higher learning, of research institutes, and of scientific expeditions, and the protection of scientific workers, etc. It would concern itself as well with historical questions: the history of the conception of science, of the scientist, of the various disciplines, and of learning in general.

In their 1935 paper, the Ossowscy mentioned the German philosopher Werner Schingnitz (1899–1953) who, in fragmentary 1931 remarks, had enumerated some possible types of research in the science of science and had proposed his own name for the new discipline: scientiology. The Ossowscy took issue with the name:
Those who wish to replace the expression 'science of science' by a one-word term [that] sound[s] international, in the belief that only after receiving such a name [will] a given group of [questions be] officially dubbed an autonomous discipline, [might] be reminded of the name 'mathesiology', proposed long ago for similar purposes [by the French mathematician and physicist André-Marie Ampère (1775–1836)]."

Yet, before long, in Poland, the unwieldy three-word term nauka o nauce, or science of science, was replaced by the more versatile one-word term naukoznawstwo, or logology, and its natural variants: naukoznawca or logologist, naukoznawczy or logological, and naukoznawczo or logologically. And just after World War II, only 11 years after the Ossowscys landmark 1935 paper, the year 1946 saw the founding of the Polish Academy of Sciences' quarterly Zagadnienia Naukoznawstwa (Logology) –— long before similar journals in many other countries.

The new discipline also took root elsewhere—in English-speaking countries, without the benefit of a one-word name.

Science

The term
The word science, from the Latin scientia meaning knowledge, signifies somewhat different things in different languages. In English, science when unqualified, generally refers to the exact, natural, or hard sciences. The corresponding terms in other languages, for example French, German, and Polish, refer to a broader domain that includes not only the exact sciences (logic and mathematics) and the natural sciences (physics, chemistry, biology, medicine, Earth sciences, geography, astronomy, etc.) but also the engineering sciences, social sciences (history, geography, psychology, physical anthropology, sociology, political science, economics, international relations, pedagogy, etc.), and humanities (philosophy, history, cultural anthropology, linguistics, etc.).

University of Amsterdam humanities professor Rens Bod points out that science—defined as a set of methods that describes and interprets observed or inferred phenomena, past or present, aimed at testing hypotheses and building theories—applies to such humanities fields as philology, art history, musicology, linguistics, archaeology, historiography, and literary studies.

Bod gives a historic example of scientific textual analysis. In 1440 the Italian philologist Lorenzo Valla exposed the Latin document Donatio Constantini, or The Donation of Constantine – which was used by the Catholic Church to legitimize its claim to lands in the Western Roman Empire – as a forgery. Valla used historical, linguistic, and philological evidence, including counterfactual reasoning, to rebut the document. Valla found words and constructions in the document that could not have been used by anyone in the time of Emperor Constantine I, at the beginning of the fourth century C.E. For example, the late Latin word feudum, meaning fief, referred to the feudal system, which would not come into existence until the medieval era, in the seventh century C.E. Valla's methods were those of science, and inspired the later scientifically-minded work of Dutch humanist Erasmus of Rotterdam (1466–1536), Leiden University professor Joseph Justus Scaliger (1540–1609), and philosopher Baruch Spinoza (1632–77).  Here it is not the experimental method  dominant in the exact and natural sciences, but the comparative method central to the humanities, that reigns supreme.

Knowability

Science's search for the truth about various aspects of reality entails the question of the very knowability of reality. Philosopher Thomas Nagel writes: "[In t]he pursuit of scientific knowledge through the interaction between theory and observation... we test theories against their observational consequences, but we also question or reinterpret our observations in light of theory. (The choice between geocentric and heliocentric theories at the time of the Copernican revolution is a vivid example.) ...
How things seem is the starting point for all knowledge, and its development through further correction, extension, and elaboration is inevitably the result of more seemings—considered judgments about the plausibility and consequences of different theoretical hypotheses. The only way to pursue the truth is to consider what seems true, after careful reflection of a kind appropriate to the subject matter, in light of all the relevant data, principles, and circumstances."

The question of knowability is approached from a different perspective by physicist-astronomer Marcelo Gleiser: "What we observe is not nature itself but nature as discerned through data we collect from machines. In consequence, the scientific worldview depends on the information we can acquire through our instruments. And given that our tools are limited, our view of the world is necessarily myopic. We can see only so far into the nature of things, and our ever shifting scientific worldview reflects this fundamental limitation on how we perceive reality." Gleiser cites the condition of biology before and after the invention of the microscope or gene sequencing; of astronomy before and after the telescope; of particle physics before and after colliders or fast electronics. "[T]he theories we build and the worldviews we construct change as our tools of exploration transform. This trend is the trademark of science."

Writes Gleiser: "There is nothing defeatist in understanding the limitations of the scientific approach to knowledge.... What should change is a sense of scientific triumphalism—the belief that no question is beyond the reach of scientific discourse.

"There are clear unknowables in science—reasonable questions that, unless currently accepted laws of nature are violated, we cannot find answers to. One example is the multiverse: the conjecture that our universe is but one among a multitude of others, each potentially with a different set of laws of nature. Other universes lie outside our causal horizon, meaning that we cannot receive or send signals to them. Any evidence for their existence would be circumstantial: for example, scars in the radiation permeating space because of a past collision with a neighboring universe."

Gleiser gives three further examples of unknowables, involving the origins of the universe; of life; and of mind:

"Scientific accounts of the origin of the universe are incomplete because they must rely on a conceptual framework to even begin to work: energy conservation, relativity, quantum physics, for instance. Why does the universe operate under these laws and not others?

"Similarly, unless we can prove that only one or very few biochemical pathways exist from nonlife to life, we cannot know for sure how life originated on Earth.

"For consciousness, the problem is the jump from the material to the subjective—for example, from firing neurons to the experience of pain or the color red. Perhaps some kind of rudimentary consciousness could emerge in a sufficiently complex machine. But how could we tell? How do we establish—as opposed to conjecture—that something is conscious?" Paradoxically, writes Gleiser, it is through our consciousness that we make sense of the world, even if imperfectly. "Can we fully understand something of which we are a part?"

Among all the sciences (i.e., disciplines of learning, writ large) there seems to exist an inverse relation between precision and intuitiveness. The most intuitive of the disciplines, aptly termed the "humanities", relate to common human experience and, even at their most exact, are thrown back on the comparative method; less intuitive and more precise than the humanities are the social sciences; while, at the base of the inverted pyramid of the disciplines, physics (concerned with mattergy – the matter and energy comprising the universe) is, at its deepest, the most precise discipline and at the same time utterly non-intuitive.

Facts and theories

Theoretical physicist and mathematician Freeman Dyson explains that "[s]cience consists of facts and theories":

"Facts are supposed to be true or false. They are discovered by observers or experimenters. A scientist who claims to have discovered a fact that turns out to be wrong is judged harshly....

"Theories have an entirely different status. They are free creations of the human mind, intended to describe our understanding of nature. Since our understanding is incomplete, theories are provisional. Theories are tools of understanding, and a tool does not need to be precisely true in order to be useful. Theories are supposed to be more-or-less true... A scientist who invents a theory that turns out to be wrong is judged leniently."

Dyson cites a psychologist's description of how theories are born: "We can't live in a state of perpetual doubt, so we make up the best story possible and we live as if the story were true." Dyson writes: "The inventor of a brilliant idea cannot tell whether it is right or wrong." The passionate pursuit of wrong theories is a normal part of the development of science. Dyson cites, after Mario Livio, five famous scientists who made major contributions to the understanding of nature but also believed firmly in a theory that proved wrong.

Charles Darwin explained the evolution of life with his theory of natural selection of inherited variations, but he believed in a theory of blending inheritance that made the propagation of new variations impossible. He never read Gregor Mendel's studies that showed that the laws of inheritance would become simple when inheritance was considered as a random process. Though Darwin in 1866 did the same experiment that Mendel had, Darwin did not get comparable results because he failed to appreciate the statistical importance of using very large experimental samples. Eventually, Mendelian inheritance by random variation would, no thanks to Darwin, provide the raw material for Darwinian selection to work on.

William Thomson (Lord Kelvin) discovered basic laws of energy and heat, then used these laws to calculate an estimate of the age of the earth that was too short by a factor of fifty. He based his calculation on the belief that the earth's mantle was solid and could transfer heat from the interior to the surface only by conduction. It is now known that the mantle is partly fluid and transfers most of the heat by the far more efficient process of convection, which carries heat by a massive circulation of hot rock moving upward and cooler rock moving downward. Kelvin could see the eruptions of volcanoes bringing hot liquid from deep underground to the surface; but his skill in calculation blinded him to processes, such as volcanic eruptions, that could not be calculated.

Linus Pauling discovered the chemical structure of protein and proposed a completely wrong structure for DNA, which carries hereditary information from parent to offspring. Pauling guessed a wrong structure for DNA because he assumed that a pattern that worked for protein would also work for DNA. He overlooked the gross chemical differences between protein and DNA. Francis Crick and James Watson paid attention to the differences and found the correct structure for DNA that Pauling had missed a year earlier.

Astronomer Fred Hoyle discovered the process by which the heavier elements essential to life are created by nuclear reactions in the cores of massive stars. He then proposed a theory of the history of the universe known as steady-state cosmology, which has the universe existing forever without an initial Big Bang (as Hoyle derisively dubbed it). He held his belief in the steady state long after observations proved that the Big Bang had happened.

Albert Einstein discovered the theory of space, time, and gravitation known as general relativity, and then added a cosmological constant, later known as dark energy. Subsequently, Einstein withdrew his proposal of dark energy, believing it unnecessary. Long after his death, observations suggested that dark energy really exists, so that Einstein's addition to the theory may have been right; and his withdrawal, wrong.

To Mario Livio's five examples of scientists who blundered, Dyson adds a sixth: himself. Dyson had concluded, on theoretical principles, that what was to become known as the W-particle, a charged weak boson, could not exist. An experiment conducted at CERN, in Geneva, later proved him wrong. "With hindsight I could see several reasons why my stability argument would not apply to W-particles. [They] are too massive and too short-lived to be a constituent of anything that resembles ordinary matter."

Truth

Harvard University historian of science Naomi Oreskes points out that the truth of scientific findings can never be assumed to be finally, absolutely settled. The history of science offers many examples of matters that scientists once thought to be settled and which have proven not to be, such as the concepts of Earth being the center of the universe, the absolute nature of time and space, the stability of continents, and the cause of infectious disease.

Science, writes Oreskes, is not a fixed, immutable set of discoveries but "a process of learning and discovery [...]. Science can also be understood as an institution (or better, a set of institutions) that facilitates this work.

It is often asserted that scientific findings are true because scientists use "the scientific method". But, writes Oreskes, "we can never actually agree on what that method is. Some will say it is empiricism: observation and description of the world. Others will say it is the experimental method: the use of experience and experiment to test hypotheses. (This is cast sometimes as the hypothetico-deductive method, in which the experiment must be framed as a deduction from theory, and sometimes as falsification, where the point of observation and experiment is to refute theories, not to confirm them.) Recently a prominent scientist claimed the scientific method was to avoid fooling oneself into thinking something is true that is not, and vice versa."

In fact, writes Oreskes, the methods of science have varied between disciplines and across time. "Many scientific practices, particularly statistical tests of significance, have been developed with the idea of avoiding wishful thinking and self-deception, but that hardly constitutes 'the scientific method.'"

Science, writes Oreskes, "is not simple, and neither is the natural world; therein lies the challenge of science communication. [...] Our efforts to understand and characterize the natural world are just that: efforts. Because we're human, we often fall flat."

"Scientific theories", according to Oreskes, "are not perfect replicas of reality, but we have good reason to believe that they capture significant elements of it."

Empiricism

Steven Weinberg, 1979 Nobel laureate in physics, and a historian of science, writes that the core goal of science has always been the same: "to explain the world"; and in reviewing earlier periods of scientific thought, he concludes that only since Isaac Newton has that goal been pursued more or less correctly. He decries the "intellectual snobbery" that Plato and Aristotle showed in their disdain for science's practical applications, and he holds Francis Bacon and René Descartes to have been the "most overrated" among the forerunners of modern science (they tried to prescribe rules for conducting science, which "never works").

Weinberg draws parallels between past and present science, as when a scientific theory is "fine-tuned" (adjusted) to make certain quantities equal, without any understanding of why they should be equal. Such adjusting vitiated the celestial models of Plato's followers, in which different spheres carrying the planets and stars were assumed, with no good reason, to rotate in exact unison. But, Weinberg writes, a similar fine-tuning also besets current efforts to understand the "dark energy" that is speeding up the expansion of the universe.

Ancient science has been described as having gotten off to a good start, then faltered. The doctrine of atomism, propounded by the pre-Socratic philosophers Leucippus and Democritus, was naturalistic, accounting for the workings of the world by impersonal processes, not by divine volitions. Nevertheless, these pre-Socratics come up short for Weinberg as proto-scientists, in that they apparently never tried to justify their speculations or to test them against evidence.

Weinberg believes that science faltered early on due to Plato's suggestion that scientific truth could be attained by reason alone, disregarding empirical observation, and due to Aristotle's attempt to explain nature teleologically—in terms of ends and purposes. Plato's ideal of attaining knowledge of the world by unaided intellect was "a false goal inspired by mathematics"—one that for centuries "stood in the way of progress that could be based only on careful analysis of careful observation." And it "never was fruitful" to ask, as Aristotle did, "what is the purpose of this or that physical phenomenon."

A scientific field in which the Greek and Hellenistic world did make progress was astronomy. This was partly for practical reasons: the sky had long served as compass, clock, and calendar. Also, the regularity of the movements of heavenly bodies made them simpler to describe than earthly phenomena. But not too simple: though the sun, moon and "fixed stars" seemed regular in their celestial circuits, the "wandering stars"—the planets—were puzzling; they seemed to move at variable speeds, and even to reverse direction. Writes Weinberg: "Much of the story of the emergence of modern science deals with the effort, extending over two millennia, to explain the peculiar motions of the planets."

The challenge was to make sense of the apparently irregular wanderings of the planets on the assumption that all heavenly motion is actually circular and uniform in speed. Circular, because Plato held the circle to be the most perfect and symmetrical form; and therefore circular motion, at uniform speed, was most fitting for celestial bodies. Aristotle agreed with Plato. In Aristotle's cosmos, everything had a "natural" tendency to motion that fulfilled its inner potential. For the cosmos' sublunary part (the region below the moon), the natural tendency was to move in a straight line: downward, for earthen things (such as rocks) and water; upward, for air and fiery things (such as sparks). But in the celestial realm things were not composed of earth, water, air, or fire, but of a "fifth element", or "quintessence," which was perfect and eternal. And its natural motion was uniformly circular. The stars, the sun, the moon, and the planets were carried in their orbits by a complicated arrangement of crystalline spheres, all centered around an immobile earth.

The Platonic-Aristotelian conviction that celestial motions must be circular persisted stubbornly. It was fundamental to the astronomer Ptolemy's system, which improved on Aristotle's in conforming to the astronomical data by allowing the planets to move in combinations of circles called "epicycles".

It even survived the Copernican revolution. Copernicus was conservative in his Platonic reverence for the circle as the heavenly pattern. According to Weinberg, Copernicus was motivated to dethrone the earth in favor of the sun as the immobile center of the cosmos largely by aesthetic considerations: he objected to the fact that Ptolemy, though faithful to Plato's requirement that heavenly motion be circular, had departed from Plato's other requirement that it be of uniform speed. By putting the sun at the center—actually, somewhat off-center—Copernicus sought to honor circularity while restoring uniformity. But to make his system fit the observations as well as Ptolemy's system, Copernicus had to introduce still more epicycles. That was a mistake that, writes Weinberg, illustrates a recurrent theme in the history of science: "A simple and beautiful theory that agrees pretty well with observation is often closer to the truth than a complicated ugly theory that agrees better with observation."

The planets, however, do not move in perfect circles but in ellipses. It was Johannes Kepler, about a century after Copernicus, who reluctantly (for he too had Platonic affinities) realized this. Thanks to his examination of the meticulous observations compiled by astronomer Tycho Brahe, Kepler "was the first to understand the nature of the departures from uniform circular motion that had puzzled astronomers since the time of Plato."

The replacement of circles by supposedly ugly ellipses overthrew Plato's notion of perfection as the celestial explanatory principle. It also destroyed Aristotle's model of the planets carried in their orbits by crystalline spheres; writes Weinberg, "there is no solid body whose rotation can produce an ellipse." Even if a planet were attached to an ellipsoid crystal, that crystal's rotation would still trace a circle. And if the planets were pursuing their elliptical motion through empty space, then what was holding them in their orbits?

Science had reached the threshold of explaining the world not geometrically, according to shape, but dynamically, according to force. It was Isaac Newton who finally crossed that threshold. He was the first to formulate, in his "laws of motion", the concept of force. He demonstrated that Kepler's ellipses were the very orbits the planets would take if they were attracted toward the sun by a force that decreased as the square of the planet's distance from the sun. And by comparing the moon's motion in its orbit around the earth to the motion of, perhaps, an apple as it falls to the ground, Newton deduced that the forces governing them were quantitatively the same. "This," writes Weinberg, "was the climactic step in the unification of the celestial and terrestrial in science."

By formulating a unified explanation of the behavior of planets, comets, moons, tides, and apples, writes Weinberg, Newton "provided an irresistible model for what a physical theory should be"—a model that fit no preexisting metaphysical criterion. In contrast to Aristotle, who claimed to explain the falling of a rock by appeal to its inner striving, Newton was unconcerned with finding a deeper cause for gravity. He declared in a postscript to the second, 1713 edition of his Philosophiæ Naturalis Principia Mathematica: "I have not as yet been able to deduce from phenomena the reason for these properties of gravity, and I do not feign hypotheses. It is enough that gravity really exists and acts according to the laws that we have set forth." What mattered were his mathematically stated principles describing this force, and their ability to account for a vast range of phenomena.

About two centuries later, in 1915, a deeper explanation for Newton's law of gravitation was found in Albert Einstein's general theory of relativity: gravity could be explained as a manifestation of the curvature in spacetime resulting from the presence of matter and energy. Successful theories like Newton's, writes Weinberg, may work for reasons that their creators do not understand—reasons that deeper theories will later reveal. Scientific progress is not a matter of building theories on a foundation of reason, but of unifying a greater range of phenomena under simpler and more general principles.

Artificial intelligence

The term "artificial intelligence" (AI) was coined in 1955 by John McCarthy when he and other computer scientists were planning a workshop and did not want to invite Norbert Wiener, the brilliant, pugnacious, and increasingly philosophical (rather than practical) author on feedback mechanisms who had coined the term "cybernetics". The new term artificial intelligence, writes Kenneth Cukier, "set in motion decades of semantic squabbles ('Can machines think?') and fueled anxieties over malicious robots... If McCarthy... had chosen a blander phrase—say, 'automation studies'—the concept might not have appealed as much to Hollywood [movie] producers and [to] journalists..."

As machines have become increasingly capable, specific tasks considered to require "intelligence", such as optical character recognition, have often been removed from the definition of AI, a phenomenon known as the "AI effect". It has been quipped that "AI is whatever hasn't been done yet."

Since 1950, when Alan Turing proposed what has come to be called the "Turing test," there has been speculation whether machines such as computers can possess intelligence; and, if so, whether intelligent machines could become a threat to human intellectual and scientific ascendancy—or even an existential threat to humanity. John Searle points out common confusion about the correct interpretation of computation and information technology. "For example, one routinely reads that in exactly the same sense in which Garry Kasparov… beat Anatoly Karpov in chess, the computer called Deep Blue played and beat Kasparov.... [T]his claim is [obviously] suspect. In order for Kasparov to play and win, he has to be conscious that he is playing chess, and conscious of a thousand other things... Deep Blue is conscious of none of these things because it is not conscious of anything at all. Why is consciousness so important? You cannot literally play chess or do much of anything else cognitive if you are totally disassociated from consciousness."

Searle explains that, "in the literal, real, observer-independent sense in which humans compute, mechanical computers do not compute. They go through a set of transitions in electronic states that we can interpret computationally. The transitions in those electronic states are absolute or observer-independent, but the computation is observer-relative. The transitions in physical states are just electrical sequences unless some conscious agent can give them a computational interpretation.... There is no psychological reality at all to what is happening in the [computer]."

"[A] digital computer", writes Searle, "is a syntactical machine. It manipulates symbols and does nothing else. For this reason, the project of creating human intelligence by designing a computer program that will pass the Turing Test... is doomed from the start. The appropriately programmed computer has a syntax [rules for constructing or transforming the symbols and words of a language] but no semantics [comprehension of meaning].... Minds, on the other hand, have mental or semantic content."

Like Searle, Christof Koch, chief scientist and president of the Allen Institute for Brain Science, in Seattle, is doubtful about the possibility of "intelligent" machines attaining consciousness, because "[e]ven the most sophisticated brain simulations are unlikely to produce conscious feelings." According to Koch, "Whether machines can become sentient [is important] for ethical reasons. If computers experience life through their own senses, they cease to be purely a means to an end determined by their usefulness to... humans. Per GNW [the Global Neuronal Workspace theory], they turn from mere objects into subjects... with a point of view.... Once computers' cognitive abilities rival those of humanity, their impulse to push for legal and political rights will become irresistible – the right not to be deleted, not to have their memories wiped clean, not to suffer pain and degradation. The alternative, embodied by IIT [Integrated Information Theory], is that computers will remain only supersophisticated machinery, ghostlike empty shells, devoid of what we value most: the feeling of life itself."

Professor of psychology and neural science Gary Marcus points out a so far insuperable stumbling block to artificial intelligence: an incapacity for reliable disambiguation. "[V]irtually every sentence [that people generate] is ambiguous, often in multiple ways. Our brain is so good at comprehending language that we do not usually notice." A prominent example is known as the "pronoun disambiguation problem" ("PDP"): a machine has no way of determining to whom or what a pronoun in a sentence—such as "he", "she" or "it"—refers.

Computer scientist Pedro Domingos writes: "AIs are like autistic savants and will remain so for the foreseeable future.... AIs lack common sense and can easily make errors that a human never would... They are also liable to take our instructions too literally, giving us precisely what we asked for instead of what we actually wanted.

Kai-Fu Lee, a Beijing-based venture capitalist, artificial-intelligence (AI) expert with a Ph.D. in computer science from Carnegie Mellon University, and author of the 2018 book, AI Superpowers: China, Silicon Valley, and the New World Order, emphasized in a 2018 PBS Amanpour interview with Hari Sreenivasan that AI, with all its capabilities, will never be capable of creativity or empathy. Paul Scharre writes in Foreign Affairs that "Today's AI technologies are powerful but unreliable." George Dyson, historian of computing, writes (in what might be called "Dyson's Law") that "Any system simple enough to be understandable will not be complicated enough to behave intelligently, while any system complicated enough to behave intelligently will be too complicated to understand." Computer scientist Alex Pentland writes: "Current AI machine-learning algorithms are, at their core, dead simple stupid. They work, but they work by brute force."

"Artificial intelligence" is synonymous with "machine intelligence." The more perfectly adapted an AI program is to a given task, the less applicable it will be to other specific tasks. An abstracted, AI general intelligence is a remote prospect, if feasible at all. Melanie Mitchell notes that an AI program called AlphaGo bested one of the world's best Go players, but that its "intelligence" is nontransferable: it cannot "think" about anything except Go. Mitchell writes: "We humans tend to overestimate AI advances and underestimate the complexity of our own intelligence." Writes Paul Taylor: "Perhaps there is a limit to what a computer can do without knowing that it is manipulating imperfect representations of an external reality."

Humankind may not be able to outsource, to machines, its creative efforts in the sciences, technology, and culture.

Gary Marcus cautions against being taken in by deceptive claims about artificial general intelligence capabilities that are put out in press releases by self-interested companies which tell the press and public "only what the companies want us to know." Marcus writes:

Uncertainty

A central concern for science and scholarship is the reliability and reproducibility of their findings. Of all fields of study, none is capable of such precision as physics. But even there the results of studies, observations, and experiments cannot be considered absolutely certain and must be treated probabilistically; hence, statistically.

In 1925 British geneticist and statistician Ronald Fisher published Statistical Methods for Research Workers, which established him as the father of modern statistics. He proposed a statistical test that summarized the compatibility of data with a given proposed model and produced a "p value". He counselled pursuing results with p values below 0.05 and not wasting time on results above that. Thus arose the idea that a p value less than 0.05 constitutes "statistical significance" – a mathematical definition of "significant" results.

The use of p values, ever since, to determine the statistical significance of experimental results has contributed to an illusion of certainty and to reproducibility crises in many scientific fields, especially in experimental economics, biomedical research, and psychology.

Every statistical model relies on a set of assumptions about how data are collected and analyzed and about how researchers decide to present their results. These results almost always center on null-hypothesis significance testing, which produces a p value. Such testing does not address the truth head-on but obliquely: significance testing is meant to indicate only whether a given line of research is worth pursuing further. It does not say how likely the hypothesis is to be true, but instead addresses an alternative question: if the hypothesis were false, how unlikely would the data be? The importance of "statistical significance", reflected in the p value, can be exaggerated or overemphasized – something that readily occurs with small samples. That has caused replication crises.

Some scientists have advocated "redefining statistical significance", shifting its threshold from 0.05 to 0.005 for claims of new discoveries. Others say such redefining does no good because the real problem is the very existence of a threshold.

Some scientists prefer to use Bayesian methods, a more direct statistical approach which takes initial beliefs, adds in new evidence, and updates the beliefs. Another alternative procedure is to use the surprisal, a mathematical quantity that adjust p values to produce bits – as in computer bits – of information; in that perspective, 0.05 is a weak standard.

When Ronald Fisher embraced the concept of "significance" in the early 20th century, it meant "signifying" but not "important". Statistical "significance" has, since, acquired am excessive connotation of confidence in the validity of the experimental results. Statistician Andrew Gelman says, "The original sin is people wanting certainty when it's not appropriate." "Ultimately", writes Lydia Denworth, "a successful theory is one that stands up repeatedly to decades of scrutiny."

Increasingly, attention is being given to the principles of open science, such as publishing more detailed research protocols and requiring authors to follow prespecified analysis plans and to report when they deviate from them.

Discovery

Discoveries and inventions

Fifty years before Florian Znaniecki published his 1923 paper proposing the creation of an empirical field of study to study the field of science, Aleksander Głowacki (better known by his pen name, Bolesław Prus) had made the same proposal. In an 1873 public lecture "On Discoveries and Inventions", Prus said:

Prus defines "discovery" as "the finding out of a thing that has existed and exists in nature, but which was previously unknown to people"; and "invention" as "the making of a thing that has not previously existed, and which nature itself cannot make."

He illustrates the concept of "discovery":

Prus illustrates the concept of "invention":

According to Prus, "inventions and discoveries are natural phenomena and, as such, are subject to certain laws." Those are the laws of "gradualness", "dependence", and "combination".

Each of Prus' three "laws" entails important corollaries. The law of gradualness implies the following:

From the law of dependence flow the following corollaries:

Finally, Prus' corollaries to his law of combination:

But, asks Prus, "What force drives [the] toilsome, often frustrated efforts [of the investigators]? What thread will clew these people through hitherto unexplored fields of study?"

Prus holds that, over time, the multiplication of discoveries and inventions has improved the quality of people's lives and has expanded their knowledge. "This gradual advance of civilized societies, this constant growth in knowledge of the objects that exist in nature, this constant increase in the number of tools and useful materials, is termed progress, or the growth of civilization." Conversely, Prus warns, "societies and people that do not make inventions or know how to use them, lead miserable lives and ultimately perish."

Reproducibility

A fundamental feature of the scientific enterprise is reproducibility of results. "For decades", writes Shannon Palus, "it has been... an open secret that a [considerable part] of the literature in some fields is plain wrong." This effectively sabotages the scientific enterprise and costs the world many billions of dollars annually in wasted resources. Militating against reproducibility is scientists' reluctance to share techniques, for fear of forfeiting one's advantage to other scientists. Also, scientific journals and tenure committees tend to prize impressive new results rather than gradual advances that systematically build on existing literature. Scientists who quietly fact-check others' work or spend extra time ensuring that their own protocols are easy for other researchers to understand, gain little for themselves.

With a view to improving reproducibility of scientific results, it has been suggested that research-funding agencies finance only projects that include a plan for making their work transparent. In 2016 the U.S. National Institutes of Health introduced new application instructions and review questions to encourage scientists to improve reproducibility. The NIH requests more information on how the study builds on previous work, and a list of variables that could affect the study, such as the sex of animal subjects—a previously overlooked factor that led many studies to describe phenomena found in male animals as universal.

Likewise, the questions that a funder can ask in advance could be asked by journals and reviewers. One solution is "registered reports", a preregistration of studies whereby a scientist submits, for publication, research analysis and design plans before actually doing the study. Peer reviewers then evaluate the methodology, and the journal promises to print the results, no matter what they are. In order to prevent over-reliance on preregistered studies—which could encourage safer, less venturesome research, thus over-correcting the problem—the preregistered-studies model could be operated in tandem with the traditional results-focused model, which may sometimes be more friendly to serendipitous discoveries.

The "replication crisis" is compounded by a finding, published in a study summarized in 2021 by historian of science Naomi Oreskes, that nonreplicable studies are cited oftener than replicable ones: in other words, that bad science seems to get more attention than good science.  If a substantial proportion of science is unreplicable, it will not provide a valid basis for decision-making and may delay the use of science for developing new medicines and technologies.  It may also undermine the public's trust, making it harder to get people vaccinated or act against climate change.

The study tracked papers – in psychology journals, economics journals, and in Science and Nature – with documented failures of replication.  The unreplicable papers were cited more than average, even after news of their unreplicability had been published.

"These results," writes Oreskes, "parallel those of a 2018 study. An analysis of 126,000 rumor cascades on Twitter showed that false news spread faster and reached more people than verified true claims. [I]t was people, not [ro]bots, who were responsible for the disproportionate spread of falsehoods online."

Rediscovery
A 2016 Scientific American report highlights the role of rediscovery in science. Indiana University Bloomington researchers combed through 22 million scientific papers published over the previous century and found dozens of "Sleeping Beauties"—studies that lay dormant for years before getting noticed. The top finds, which languished longest and later received the most intense attention from scientists, came from the fields of chemistry, physics, and statistics. The dormant findings were wakened by scientists from other disciplines, such as medicine, in search of fresh insights, and by the ability to test once-theoretical postulations. Sleeping Beauties will likely become even more common in the future because of increasing accessibility of scientific literature. The Scientific American report lists the top 15 Sleeping Beauties: 7 in chemistry, 5 in physics, 2 in statistics, and 1 in metallurgy. Examples include:

Herbert Freundlich's "Concerning Adsorption in Solutions" (1906), the first mathematical model of adsorption, when atoms or molecules adhere to a surface. Today both environmental remediation and decontamination in industrial settings rely heavily on adsorption.

A. Einstein, B. Podolsky and N. Rosen, "Can Quantum-Mechanical Description of Physical Reality Be Considered Complete?" Physical Review, vol. 47 (May 15, 1935), pp. 777–780. This famous thought experiment in quantum physics—now known as the EPR paradox, after the authors' surname initials—was discussed theoretically when it first came out. It was not until the 1970s that physics had the experimental means to test quantum entanglement.

J[ohn] Turkevich, P. C. Stevenson, J. Hillier, "A Study of the Nucleation and Growth Processes in the Synthesis of Colloidal Gold", Discuss. Faraday. Soc., 1951, 11, pp. 55–75, explains how to suspend gold nanoparticles in liquid. It owes its awakening to medicine, which now employs gold nanoparticles to detect tumors and deliver drugs.

William S. Hummers and Richard E Offeman, "Preparation of Graphitic Oxide", Journal of the American Chemical Society, vol. 80, no. 6 (March 20, 1958), p. 1339, introduced Hummers' Method, a technique for making graphite oxide. Recent interest in graphene's potential has brought the 1958 paper to attention. Graphite oxide could serve as a reliable intermediate for the 2-D material.

Multiple discovery

Historians and sociologists have remarked the occurrence, in science, of "multiple independent discovery". Sociologist Robert K. Merton defined such "multiples" as instances in which similar discoveries are made by scientists working independently of each other. "Sometimes the discoveries are simultaneous or almost so; sometimes a scientist will make a new discovery which, unknown to him, somebody else has made years before." Commonly cited examples of multiple independent discovery are the 17th-century independent formulation of calculus by Isaac Newton, Gottfried Wilhelm Leibniz, and others; the 18th-century independent discovery of oxygen by Carl Wilhelm Scheele, Joseph Priestley, Antoine Lavoisier, and others; and the 19th-century independent formulation of the theory of evolution of species by Charles Darwin and Alfred Russel Wallace.

Merton contrasted a "multiple" with a "singleton" — a discovery that has been made uniquely by a single scientist or group of scientists working together. He believed that it is multiple discoveries, rather than unique ones, that represent the common pattern in science.

Multiple discoveries in the history of science provide evidence for evolutionary models of science and technology, such as memetics (the study of self-replicating units of culture), evolutionary epistemology (which applies the concepts of biological evolution to study of the growth of human knowledge), and cultural selection theory (which studies sociological and cultural evolution in a Darwinian manner). A recombinant-DNA-inspired "paradigm of paradigms", describing a mechanism of "recombinant conceptualization", predicates that a new concept arises through the crossing of pre-existing concepts and facts. This is what is meant when one says that a scientist, scholar, or artist has been "influenced by" another — etymologically, that a concept of the latter's has "flowed into" the mind of the former.

The phenomenon of multiple independent discoveries and inventions can be viewed as a consequence of Bolesław Prus' three laws of gradualness, dependence, and combination (see "Discoveries and inventions", above). The first two laws may, in turn, be seen as corollaries to the third law, since the laws of gradualness and dependence imply the impossibility of certain scientific or technological advances pending the availability of certain theories, facts, or technologies that must be combined to produce a given scientific or technological advance.

Technology

Technology – the application of discoveries to practical matters – showed a remarkable acceleration in what economist Robert J. Gordon has identified as "the special century" that spanned the period up to 1970. By then, he writes, all the key technologies of modern life were in place: sanitation, electricity, mechanized agriculture, highways, air travel, telecommunications, and the like. The one signature technology of the 21st century has been the iPhone. Meanwhile, a long list of much-publicized potential major technologies remain in the prototype phase, including self-driving cars, flying cars, augmented-reality glasses, gene therapy, and nuclear fusion. An urgent goal for the 21st century, writes Gordon, is to undo some of the consequences of the last great technology boom by developing affordable zero- and negative-emissions technologies.

Technology is the sum of techniques, skills, methods, and processes used in the production of goods or services or in the accomplishment of objectives, such as scientific investigation. Paradoxically, technology, so conceived, has sometimes been noted to take primacy over the ends themselves – even to their detriment. Laura Grego and David Wright, writing in 2019 in Scientific American, observe that "Current U.S. missile defense plans are being driven largely by technology, politics and fear. Missile defenses will not allow us to escape our vulnerability to nuclear weapons. Instead large-scale developments will create barriers to taking real steps toward reducing nuclear risks—by blocking further cuts in nuclear arsenals and potentially spurring new deployments."

Psychology of science

Habitus
Yale University physicist-astronomer Priyamvada Natarajan, writing of the virtually-simultaneous 1846 discovery of the planet Neptune by Urbain Le Verrier and John Couch Adams (after other astronomers, as early as Galileo Galilei in 1612, had unwittingly observed the planet), comments:

Nonconformance

A practical question concerns the traits that enable some individuals to achieve extraordinary results in their fields of work—and how such creativity can be fostered. Melissa Schilling, a student of innovation strategy, has identified some traits shared by eight major innovators in natural science or technology: Benjamin Franklin (1706–90), Thomas Edison (1847–1931), Nikola Tesla (1856–1943), Maria Skłodowska Curie (1867–1934), Dean Kamen (born 1951), Steve Jobs (1955–2011), Albert Einstein (1879–1955), and Elon Musk (born 1971).

Schilling chose innovators in natural science and technology rather than in other fields because she found much more consensus about important contributions to natural science and technology than, for example, to art or music. She further limited the set to individuals associated with multiple innovations. "When an individual is associated with only a single major invention, it is much harder to know whether the invention was caused by the inventor's personal characteristics or by simply being at the right place at the right time."

The eight individuals were all extremely intelligent, but "that is not enough to make someone a serial breakthrough innovator." Nearly all these innovators showed very high levels of social detachment, or separateness (a notable exception being Benjamin Franklin). "Their isolation meant that they were less exposed to dominant ideas and norms, and their sense of not belonging meant that even when exposed to dominant ideas and norms, they were often less inclined to adopt them." From an early age, they had all shown extreme faith in their ability to overcome obstacles—what psychology calls "self-efficacy".

"Most [of them, writes Schilling] were driven by idealism, a superordinate goal that was more important than their own comfort, reputation, or families. Nikola Tesla wanted to free mankind from labor through unlimited free energy and to achieve international peace through global communication. Elon Musk wants to solve the world's energy problems and colonize Mars. Benjamin Franklin was seeking greater social harmony and productivity through the ideals of egalitarianism, tolerance, industriousness, temperance, and charity. Marie Curie had been inspired by Polish Positivism's argument that Poland, which was under Tsarist Russian rule, could be preserved only through the pursuit of education and technological advance by all Poles—including women."

Most of the innovators also worked hard and tirelessly because they found work extremely rewarding. Some had an extremely high need for achievement. Many also appeared to find work autotelic—rewarding for its own sake. A surprisingly large portion of the breakthrough innovators have been autodidacts—self-taught persons—and excelled much more outside the classroom than inside.

"Almost all breakthrough innovation," writes Schilling, "starts with an unusual idea or with beliefs that break with conventional wisdom.... However, creative ideas alone are almost never enough. Many people have creative ideas, even brilliant ones. But usually we lack the time, knowledge, money, or motivation to act on those ideas." It is generally hard to get others' help in implementing original ideas because the ideas are often initially hard for others to understand and value. Thus each of Schilling's breakthrough innovators showed extraordinary effort and persistence. Even so, writes Schilling, "being at the right place at the right time still matter[ed]."

Lichenology

When Swiss botanist Simon Schwendener discovered in the 1860s that lichens were a symbiotic partnership between a fungus and an alga, his finding at first met with resistance from the scientific community. After his discovery that the fungus—which cannot make its own food—provides the lichen's structure, while the alga's contribution is its photosynthetic production of food, it was found that in some lichens a cyanobacterium provides the food—and a handful of lichen species contain both an alga and a cyanobacterium, along with the fungus.

A self-taught naturalist, Trevor Goward, has helped create a paradigm shift in the study of lichens and perhaps of all life-forms by doing something that people did in pre-scientific times: going out into nature and closely observing. His essays about lichens were largely ignored by most researchers because Goward has no scientific degrees and because some of his radical ideas are not supported by rigorous data.

When Goward told Toby Spribille, who at the time lacked a high-school education, about some of his lichenological ideas, Goward recalls, "He said I was delusional." Ultimately Spribille passed a high-school equivalency examination, obtained a Ph.D. in lichenology at the University of Graz in Austria, and became an assistant professor of the ecology and evolution of symbiosis at the University of Alberta. In July 2016 Spribille and his co-authors published a ground-breaking paper in Science revealing that many lichens contain a second fungus.

Spribille credits Goward with having "a huge influence on my thinking. [His essays] gave me license to think about lichens in [an unorthodox way] and freed me to see the patterns I worked out in Bryoria with my co-authors." Even so, "one of the most difficult things was allowing myself to have an open mind to the idea that 150 years of literature may have entirely missed the theoretical possibility that there would be more than one fungal partner in the lichen symbiosis." Spribille says that academia's emphasis on the canon of what others have established as important is inherently limiting.

Leadership

Contrary to previous studies indicating that higher intelligence makes for better leaders in various fields of endeavor, later research suggests that, at a certain point, a higher IQ can be viewed as harmful. Decades ago, psychologist Dean Simonton suggested that brilliant leaders' words may go over people's heads, their solutions could be more complicated to implement, and followers might find it harder to relate to them. At last, in the July 2017 Journal of Applied Psychology, he and two colleagues published the results of actual tests of the hypothesis.

Studied were 379 men and women business leaders in 30 countries, including the fields of banking, retail, and technology. The managers took IQ tests—an imperfect but robust predictor of performance in many areas—and each was rated on leadership style and effectiveness by an average of 8 co-workers. IQ correlated positively with ratings of leadership effectiveness, strategy formation, vision, and several other characteristics—up to a point. The ratings peaked at an IQ of about 120, which is higher than some 80% of office workers. Beyond that, the ratings declined. The researchers suggested that the ideal IQ could be higher or lower in various fields, depending on whether technical or social skills are more valued in a given work culture.

Psychologist Paul Sackett, not involved in the research, comments: "To me, the right interpretation of the work would be that it highlights a need to understand what high-IQ leaders do that leads to lower perceptions by followers. The wrong interpretation would be,'Don't hire high-IQ leaders.'" The study's lead author, psychologist John Antonakis, suggests that leaders should use their intelligence to generate creative metaphors that will persuade and inspire others. "I think the only way a smart person can signal their intelligence appropriately and still connect with the people," says Antonakis, "is to speak in charismatic ways."

Sociology of science

Specialization

Academic specialization produces great benefits for science and technology by focusing effort on discrete disciplines. But excessively narrow specialization can act as a roadblock to productive collaboration between traditional disciplines.

In 2017, in Manhattan, James Harris Simons, a noted mathematician and retired founder of one of the world's largest hedge funds, inaugurated the Flatiron Institute, a nonprofit enterprise whose goal is to apply his hedge fund's analytical strategies to projects dedicated to expanding knowledge and helping humanity. He has established computational divisions for research in astrophysics, biology, and quantum physics, and an interdisciplinary division for climate modelling that interfaces geology, oceanography, atmospheric science, biology, and climatology.

The latter, fourth Flatiron Institute division was inspired by a 2017 presentation to the institute's leadership by John Grotzinger, a "bio-geoscientist" from the California Institute of Technology, who explained the challenges of climate modelling. Grotzinger was a specialist in historical climate change—specifically, what had caused the great Permian extinction, during which virtually all species died. To properly assess this cataclysm, one had to understand both the rock record and the ocean's composition, but geologists did not interact much with physical oceanographers. Grotzinger's own best collaboration had resulted from a fortuitous lunch with an oceanographer. Climate modelling was an intrinsically difficult problem made worse by academia's structural divisions. "If you had it all under one umbrella... it could result [much sooner] in a major breakthrough." Simons and his team found Grotzinger's presentation compelling, and the Flatiron Institute decided to establish its fourth and final computational division.

Mentoring

Sociologist Harriet Zuckerman, in her 1977 study of natural-science Nobel laureates in the United States, was struck by the fact that more than half (48) of the 92 laureates who did their prize-winning research in the U.S. by 1972 had worked either as students, postdoctorates, or junior collaborators under older Nobel laureates. Furthermore, those 48 future laureates had worked under a total of 71 laureate masters.

Social viscosity ensures that not every qualified novice scientist attains access to the most productive centers of scientific thought. Nevertheless, writes Zuckerman, "To some extent, students of promise can choose masters with whom to work and masters can choose among the cohorts of students who present themselves for study. This process of bilateral assortative selection is conspicuously at work among the ultra-elite of science. Actual and prospective members of that elite select their scientist parents and therewith their scientist ancestors just as later they select their scientist progeny and therewith their scientist descendants."

Zuckerman writes: "[T]he lines of elite apprentices to elite masters who had themselves been elite apprentices, and so on indefinitely, often reach far back into the history of science, long before 1900, when [Alfred] Nobel's will inaugurated what now amounts to the International Academy of Sciences. As an example of the many long historical chains of elite masters and apprentices, consider the German-born English laureate Hans Krebs (1953), who traces his scientific lineage [...] back through his master, the 1931 laureate Otto Warburg. Warburg had studied with Emil Fis[c]her [1852–1919], recipient of a prize in 1902 at the age of 50, three years before it was awarded [in 1905] to his teacher, Adolf von Baeyer [1835–1917], at age 70. This lineage of four Nobel masters and apprentices has its own pre-Nobelian antecedents. Von Baeyer had been the apprentice of F[riedrich] A[ugust] Kekulé [1829–96], whose ideas of structural formulae revolutionized organic chemistry and who is perhaps best known for the often retold story about his having hit upon the ring structure of benzene in a dream (1865). Kekulé himself had been trained by the great organic chemist Justus von Liebig (1803–73), who had studied at the Sorbonne with the master J[oseph] L[ouis] Gay-Lussac (1778–1850), himself once apprenticed to Claude Louis Berthollet (1748–1822). Among his many institutional and cognitive accomplishments, Berthollet helped found the École Polytechnique, served as science advisor to Napoleon in Egypt, and, more significant for our purposes here, worked with [Antoine] Lavoisier [1743–94] to revise the standard system of chemical nomenclature."

Collaboration
Sociologist Michael P. Farrell has studied close creative groups and writes: "Most of the fragile insights that laid the foundation of a new vision emerged not when the whole group was together, and not when members worked alone, but when they collaborated and repsonded to one another in pairs." François Jacob, who, with Jacques Monod, pioneered the study of gene regulation, notes that by the mid-20th century, most research in molecular biology was conducted by twosomes. "Two are better than one for dreaming up theories and constructing models," writes Jacob. "For with two minds working on a problem, ideas fly thicker and faster. They are bounced from partner to partner.... And in the process, illusions are sooner nipped in the bud." As of 2018, in the previous 35 years, some half of Nobel Prizes in Physiology or Medicine had gone to scientific partnerships. James Somers describes a remarkable partnership between Google's top software engineers, Jeff Dean and Sanjay Ghemawat.

Twosome collaborations have also been prominent in creative endeavors outside the natural sciences and technology; examples are Monet's and Renoir's 1869 joint creation of Impressionism, Pablo Picasso's and Georges Braque's six-year collaborative creation of Cubism, and John Lennon's and Paul McCartney's collaborations on Beatles songs. "Everyone", writes James Somers, "falls into creative ruts, but two people rarely do so at the same time."

The same point was made by Francis Crick, member of what may be history's most famous scientific duo, Francis Crick and James Watson, who together discovered the structure of the genetic material, DNA. At the end of a PBS television documentary on James Watson, in a video clipping Crick explains to Watson that their collaboration had been crucial to their discovery because, when one of them was wrong, the other would set him straight.

Politics

Big Science

What has been dubbed "Big Science" emerged from the United States' World War II Manhattan Project that produced the world's first nuclear weapons; and Big Science has since been associated with physics, which requires massive particle accelerators. In biology, Big Science debuted in 1990 with the Human Genome Project to sequence human DNA. In 2013 neuroscience became a Big Science domain when the U.S. announced a BRAIN Initiative and the European Union announced a Human Brain Project. Major new brain-research initiatives were also announced by Israel, Canada, Australia, New Zealand, Japan, and China.

Earlier successful Big Science projects had habituated politicians, mass media, and the public to view Big Science programs with sometimes uncritical favor.

The U.S.'s BRAIN Initiative was inspired by concern about the spread and cost of mental disorders and by excitement about new brain-manipulation technologies such as optogenetics. After some early false starts, the U.S. National Institute of Mental Health let the country's brain scientists define the BRAIN Initiative, and this led to an ambitious interdisciplinary program to develop new technological tools to better monitor, measure, and simulate the brain. Competition in research was ensured by the National Institute of Mental Health's peer-review process.

In the European Union, the European Commission's Human Brain Project got off to a rockier start because political and economic considerations obscured questions concerning the feasibility of the Project's initial scientific program, based principally on computer modeling of neural circuits. Four years earlier, in 2009, fearing that the European Union would fall further behind the U.S. in computer and other technologies, the European Union had begun creating a competition for Big Science projects, and the initial program for the Human Brain Project seemed a good fit for a European program that might take a lead in advanced and emerging technologies. Only in 2015, after over 800 European neuroscientists threatened to boycott the European-wide collaboration, were changes introduced into the Human Brain Project, supplanting many of the original political and economic considerations with scientific ones.

As of 2019, the European Union's Human Brain Project had not lived up to its extravagant promise.

Funding

Government funding

Nathan Myhrvold, former Microsoft chief technology officer and founder of Microsoft Research, argues that the funding of basic science cannot be left to the private sector—that "without government resources, basic science will grind to a halt." He notes that Albert Einstein's general theory of relativity, published in 1915, did not spring full-blown from his brain in a eureka moment; he worked at it for years—finally driven to complete it by a rivalry with mathematician David Hilbert. The history of almost any iconic scientific discovery or technological invention—the lightbulb, the transistor, DNA, even the Internet—shows that the famous names credited with the breakthrough "were only a few steps ahead of a pack of competitors." Some writers and elected officials have used this phenomenon of "parallel innovation" to argue against public financing of basic research: government, they assert, should leave it to companies to finance the research they need.

Myhrvold writes that such arguments are dangerously wrong: without government support, most basic scientific research will never happen. "This is most clearly true for the kind of pure research that has delivered... great intellectual benefits but no profits, such as the work that brought us the Higgs boson, or the understanding that a supermassive black hole sits at the center of the Milky Way, or the discovery of methane seas on the surface of Saturn's moon Titan. Company research laboratories used to do this kind of work: experimental evidence for the Big Bang was discovered at AT&T's Bell Labs, resulting in a Nobel Prize. Now those days are gone."

Even in applied fields such as materials science and computer science, writes Myhrvold, "companies now understand that basic research is a form of charity—so they avoid it." Bell Labs scientists created the transistor, but that invention earned billions for Intel and Microsoft. Xerox PARC engineers invented the modern graphical user interface, but Apple and Microsoft profited most. IBM researchers pioneered the use of giant magnetoresistance to boost hard-disk capacity but soon lost the disk-drive business to Seagate and Western Digital.

Company researchers now have to focus narrowly on innovations that can quickly bring revenue; otherwise the research budget could not be justified to the company's investors. "Those who believe profit-driven companies will altruistically pay for basic science that has wide-ranging benefits—but mostly to others and not for a generation—are naive.... If government were to leave it to the private sector to pay for basic research, most science would come to a screeching halt. What research survived would be done largely in secret, for fear of handing the next big thing to a rival."

Governmental investment is equally vital in the field of biological research. According to William A. Haseltine, a former Harvard Medical School professor and founder of that university's cancer and HIV / AIDS research departments, early efforts to control the COVID-19 pandemic were hampered by governments and industry everywhere having "pulled the plug on coronavirus research funding in 2006 after the first SARS [...] pandemic faded away and again in the years immediately following the MERS [outbreak, also caused by a coronavirus] when it seemed to be controllable. [...] The development of promising anti-SARS and MERS drugs, which might have been active against SARS–CoV-2 [in the Covid-19 pandemic] as well, was left unfinished for lack of money." Haseltine continues:

Private funding

A complementary perspective on the funding of scientific research is given by D.T. Max, writing about the Flatiron Institute, a computational center set up in 2017 in Manhattan to provide scientists with mathematical assistance. The Flatiron Institute was established by James Harris Simons, a mathematician who had used mathematical algorithms to make himself a Wall Street billionaire. The institute has three computational divisions dedicated respectively to astrophysics, biology, and quantum physics, and is working on a fourth division for climate modeling that will involve interfaces of geology, oceanography, atmospheric science, biology, and climatology.

The Flatiron Institute is part of a trend in the sciences toward privately funded research. In the United States, basic science has traditionally been financed by universities or the government, but private institutes are often faster and more focused. Since the 1990s, when Silicon Valley began producing billionaires, private institutes have sprung up across the U.S. In 1997 Larry Ellison launched the Ellison Medical Foundation to study the biology of aging. In 2003 Paul Allen founded the Allen Institute for Brain Science. In 2010 Eric Schmidt founded the Schmidt Ocean Institute.

These institutes have done much good, partly by providing alternatives to more rigid systems. But private foundations also have liabilities. Wealthy benefactors tend to direct their funding toward their personal enthusiasms. And foundations are not taxed; much of the money that supports them would otherwise have gone to the government.

Funding biases
John P.A. Ioannidis, of Stanford University Medical School, writes that "There is increasing evidence that some of the ways we conduct, evaluate, report and disseminate research are miserably ineffective. A series of papers in 2014 in The Lancet... estimated that 85 percent of investment in biomedical research is wasted. Many other disciplines have similar problems." Ioannidis identifies some science-funding biases that undermine the efficiency of the scientific enterprise, and proposes solutions:

Funding too few scientists: "[M]ajor success [in scientific research] is largely the result of luck, as well as hard work. The investigators currently enjoying huge funding are not necessarily genuine superstars; they may simply be the best connected." Solutions: "Use a lottery to decide which grant applications to fund (perhaps after they pass a basic review).... Shift... funds from senior people to younger researchers..."

No reward for transparency: "Many scientific protocols, analysis methods, computational processes and data are opaque. [M]any top findings cannot be reproduced. That is the case for two out of three top psychology papers, one out of three top papers in experimental economics and more than 75 percent of top papers identifying new cancer drug targets. [S]cientists are not rewarded for sharing their techniques." Solutions: "Create better infrastructure for enabling transparency, openness and sharing. Make transparency a prerequisite for funding. [P]referentially hire, promote or tenure... champions of transparency."

No encouragement for replication: Replication is indispensable to the scientific method. Yet, under pressure to produce new discoveries, researchers tend to have little incentive, and much counterincentive, to try replicating results of previous studies. Solutions: "Funding agencies must pay for replication studies. Scientists' advancement should be based not only on their discoveries but also on their replication track record."

No funding for young scientists: "Werner Heisenberg, Albert Einstein, Paul Dirac and Wolfgang Pauli made their top contributions in their mid-20s." But the average age of biomedical scientists receiving their first substantial grant is 46. The average age for a full professor in the U.S. is 55. Solutions: "A larger proportion of funding should be earmarked for young investigators. Universities should try to shift the aging distribution of their faculty by hiring more young investigators."

Biased funding sources: "Most funding for research and development in the U.S. comes not from the government but from private, for-profit sources, raising unavoidable conflicts of interest and pressure to deliver results favorable to the sponsor." Solutions: "Restrict or even ban funding that has overt conflicts of interest. Journals should not accept research with such conflicts. For less conspicuous conflicts, at a minimum ensure transparent and thorough disclosure."

Funding the wrong fields: "Well-funded fields attract more scientists to work for them, which increases their lobbying reach, fueling a vicious circle. Some entrenched fields absorb enormous funding even though they have clearly demonstrated limited yield or uncorrectable flaws." Solutions: "Independent, impartial assessment of output is necessary for lavishly funded fields. More funds should be earmarked for new fields and fields that are high risk. Researchers should be encouraged to switch fields, whereas currently they are incentivized to focus in one area."

Not spending enough: The U.S. military budget ($886 billion) is 24 times the budget of the National Institutes of Health ($37 billion). "Investment in science benefits society at large, yet attempts to convince the public often make matters worse when otherwise well-intentioned science leaders promise the impossible, such as promptly eliminating all cancer or Alzheimer's disease." Solutions: "We need to communicate how science funding is used by making the process of science clearer, including the number of scientists it takes to make major accomplishments.... We would also make a more convincing case for science if we could show that we do work hard on improving how we run it."

Rewarding big spenders: "Hiring, promotion and tenure decisions primarily rest on a researcher's ability to secure high levels of funding. But the expense of a project does not necessarily correlate with its importance. Such reward structures select mostly for politically savvy managers who know how to absorb money." Solutions: "We should reward scientists for high-quality work, reproducibility and social value rather than for securing funding. Excellent research can be done with little to no funding other than protected time. Institutions should provide this time and respect scientists who can do great work without wasting tons of money."

No funding for high-risk ideas: "The pressure that taxpayer money be 'well spent' leads government funders to back projects most likely to pay off with a positive result, even if riskier projects might lead to more important, but less assured, advances. Industry also avoids investing in high-risk projects... Innovation is extremely difficult, if not impossible, to predict..." Solutions: "Fund excellent scientists rather than projects and give them freedom to pursue research avenues as they see fit. Some institutions such as Howard Hughes Medical Institute already use this model with success." It must be communicated to the public and to policy-makers that science is a cumulative investment, that no one can know in advance which projects will succeed, and that success must be judged on the total agenda, not on a single experiment or result.

Lack of good data: "There is relatively limited evidence about which scientific practices work best. We need more research on research ('meta-research') to understand how to best perform, evaluate, review, disseminate and reward science." Solutions: "We should invest in studying how to get the best science and how to choose and reward the best scientists."

Diversity
Naomi Oreskes, professor of the history of science at Harvard University, writes about the desirability of diversity in the backgrounds of scientists.

Sexual bias

Claire Pomeroy, president of the Lasker Foundation, which is dedicated to advancing medical research, points out that women scientists continue to be subjected to discrimination in professional advancement.

Though the percentage of doctorates awarded to women in life sciences in the United States increased from 15 to 52 percent between 1969 and 2009, only a third of assistant professors and less than a fifth of full professors in biology-related fields in 2009 were women. Women make up only 15 percent of permanent department chairs in medical schools and barely 16 percent of medical-school deans.

The problem is a culture of unconscious bias that leaves many women feeling demoralized and marginalized. In one study, science faculty were given identical résumés in which the names and genders of two applicants were interchanged; both male and female faculty judged the male applicant to be more competent and offered him a higher salary.

Unconscious bias also appears as "microassaults" against women scientists: purportedly insignificant sexist jokes and insults that accumulate over the years and undermine confidence and ambition. Writes Claire Pomeroy: "Each time it is assumed that the only woman in the lab group will play the role of recording secretary, each time a research plan becomes finalized in the men's lavatory between conference sessions, each time a woman is not invited to go out for a beer after the plenary lecture to talk shop, the damage is reinforced."

"When I speak to groups of women scientists," writes Pomeroy, "I often ask them if they have ever been in a meeting where they made a recommendation, had it ignored, and then heard a man receive praise and support for making the same point a few minutes later. Each time the majority of women in the audience raise their hands. Microassaults are especially damaging when they come from a high-school science teacher, college mentor, university dean or a member of the scientific elite who has been awarded a prestigious prize—the very people who should be inspiring and supporting the next generation of scientists."

Sexual harassment

Sexual harassment is more prevalent in academia than in any other social sector except the military. A June 2018 report by the National Academies of Sciences, Engineering, and Medicine states that sexual harassment hurts individuals, diminishes the pool of scientific talent, and ultimately damages the integrity of science.

Paula Johnson, co-chair of the committee that drew up the report, describes some measures for preventing sexual harassment in science. One would be to replace trainees' individual mentoring with group mentoring, and to uncouple the mentoring relationship from the trainee's financial dependence on the mentor. Another way would be to prohibit the use of confidentiality agreements in connection with harassment cases.

A novel approach to the reporting of sexual harassment, dubbed Callisto, that has been adopted by some institutions of higher education, lets aggrieved persons record experiences of sexual harassment, date-stamped, without actually formally reporting them. This program lets people see if others have recorded experiences of harassment from the same individual, and share information anonymously.

Deterrent stereotypes
Psychologist Andrei Cimpian and philosophy professor Sarah-Jane Leslie have proposed a theory to explain why American women and African-Americans are often subtly deterred from seeking to enter certain academic fields by a misplaced emphasis on genius. Cimpian and Leslie had noticed that their respective fields are similar in their substance but hold different views on what is important for success. Much more than psychologists, philosophers value a certain kind of person: the "brilliant superstar" with an exceptional mind. Psychologists are more likely to believe that the leading lights in psychology grew to achieve their positions through hard work and experience. In 2015, women accounted for less than 30% of doctorates granted in philosophy; African-Americans made up only 1% of philosophy Ph.D.s. Psychology, on the other hand, has been successful in attracting women (72% of 2015 psychology Ph.D.s) and African-Americans (6% of psychology Ph.D.s).

An early insight into these disparities was provided to Cimpian and Leslie by the work of psychologist Carol Dweck. She and her colleagues had shown that a person's beliefs about ability matter a great deal for that person's ultimate success. A person who sees talent as a stable trait is motivated to "show off this aptitude" and to avoid making mistakes. By contrast, a person who adopts a "growth mindset" sees his or her current capacity as a work in progress: for such a person, mistakes are not an indictment but a valuable signal highlighting which of their skills are in need of work. Cimpian and Leslie and their collaborators tested the hypothesis that attitudes, about "genius" and about the unacceptability of making mistakes, within various academic fields may account for the relative attractiveness of those fields for American women and African-Americans. They did so by contacting academic professionals from a wide range of disciplines and asking them whether they thought that some form of exceptional intellectual talent was required for success in their field. The answers received from almost 2,000 academics in 30 fields matched the distribution of Ph.D.s in the way that Cimpian and Leslie had expected: fields that placed more value on brilliance also conferred fewer Ph.D.s on women and African-Americans. The proportion of women and African-American Ph.D.s in psychology, for example, was higher than the parallel proportions for philosophy, mathematics, or physics.

Further investigation showed that non-academics share similar ideas of which fields require brilliance. Exposure to these ideas at home or school could discourage young members of stereotyped groups from pursuing certain careers, such as those in the natural sciences or engineering. To explore this, Cimpian and Leslie asked hundreds of five-, six-, and seven-year-old boys and girls questions that measured whether they associated being "really, really smart" (i.e., "brilliant") with their sex. The results, published in January 2017 in Science, were consistent with scientific literature on the early acquisition of sex stereotypes. Five-year-old boys and girls showed no difference in their self-assessment; but by age six, girls were less likely to think that girls are "really, really smart." The authors next introduced another group of five-, six-, and seven-year-olds to unfamiliar gamelike activities that the authors described as being "for children who are really, really smart." Comparison of boys' and girls' interest in these activities at each age showed no sex difference at age five but significantly greater interest from boys at ages six and seven—exactly the ages when stereotypes emerge.

Cimpian and Leslie conclude that, "Given current societal stereotypes, messages that portray [genius or brilliance] as singularly necessary [for academic success] may needlessly discourage talented members of stereotyped groups."

Academic snobbery

Largely as a result of his growing popularity, astronomer and science popularizer Carl Sagan, creator of the 1980 PBS TV Cosmos series, came to be ridiculed by scientist peers and failed to receive tenure at Harvard University in the 1960s and membership in the National Academy of Sciences in the 1990s. The eponymous "Sagan effect" persists: as a group, scientists still discourage individual investigators from engaging with the public unless they are already well-established senior researchers.

The operation of the Sagan effect deprives society of the full range of expertise needed to make informed decisions about complex questions, including genetic engineering, climate change, and energy alternatives. Fewer scientific voices mean fewer arguments to counter antiscience or pseudoscientific discussion. The Sagan effect also creates the false impression that science is the domain of older white men (who dominate the senior ranks), thereby tending to discourage women and minorities from considering science careers.

A number of factors contribute to the Sagan effect's durability. At the height of the Scientific Revolution in the 17th century, many researchers emulated the example of Isaac Newton, who dedicated himself to physics and mathematics and never married. These scientists were viewed as pure seekers of truth who were not distracted by more mundane concerns. Similarly, today anything that takes scientists away from their research, such as having a hobby or taking part in public debates, can undermine their credibility as researchers.

Another, more prosaic factor in the Sagan effect's persistence may be professional jealousy.

However, there appear to be some signs that engaging with the rest of society is becoming less hazardous to a career in science. So many people have social-media accounts now that becoming a public figure is not as unusual for scientists as previously. Moreover, as traditional funding sources stagnate, going public sometimes leads to new, unconventional funding streams. A few institutions such as Emory University and the Massachusetts Institute of Technology may have begun to appreciate outreach as an area of academic activity, in addition to the traditional roles of research, teaching, and administration. Exceptional among federal funding agencies, the National Science Foundation now officially favors popularization.

Institutional snobbery
Like infectious diseases, ideas in academia are contagious. But why some ideas gain great currency while equally good ones remain in relative obscurity had been unclear. A team of computer scientists has used an epidemiological model to simulate how ideas move from one academic institution to another. The model-based findings, published in October 2018, show that ideas originating at prestigious institutions cause bigger "epidemics" than equally good ideas from less prominent places. The finding reveals a big weakness in how science is done. Many highly trained people with good ideas do not obtain posts at the most prestigious institutions; much good work published by workers at less prestigious places is overlooked by other scientists and scholars because they are not paying attention.

Public relations
Resistance, among some of the public, to accepting vaccination and the reality of climate change may be traceable partly to several decades of partisan attacks on government, leading to distrust of government science and then of science generally.

Naomi Oreskes identifies another factor that "turns people off": scientists' frequent use of jargon – of expressions that tend to be misinterpreted by, or incomprehensible to, laypersons.

In climatological parlance, "positive feedback" refers to amplifying feedback loops, such as the ice-albedo feedback. ("Albedo", another piece of jargon, simply means "reflectivity".) The positive loop in question develops when global warming causes Arctic ice to melt, exposing water that is darker and reflects less of the sun's warming rays, leading to more warming, which leads to more melting... and so on. In climatology, such positive feedback is a bad thing; but for most laypersons, "it conjures reassuring images, such as receiving praise from your boss.".

Publish or perish

"[R]esearchers," writes Naomi Oreskes, "are often judged more by the quantity of their output than its quality. Universities [emphasize] metrics such as the numbers of published papers and citations when they make hiring, tenure and promotion decisions."  

When – for a number of possible reasons – publication in legitimate peer-reviewed journals is not feasible, this often creates a perverse incentive to publish in "predatory journals", which do not uphold scientific standards. Some 8,000 such journals publish 420,000 papers annually – nearly a fifth of the scientific community's annual output of 2.5 million papers. The papers published in a predatory journal are listed in scientific databases alongside legitimate journals, making it hard to discern the difference.

One reason why some scientists publish in predatory journals is that prestigious scientific journals may charge scientists thousands of dollars for publishing, whereas a predatory journal typically charges less than $200. (Hence authors of papers in the predatory journals are disproportionately located in less wealthy countries and institutions.)

Publishing in predatory journals can be life-threatening when physicians and patients accept spurious claims about medical treatments; and invalid studies can wrongly influence public policy. More such predatory journals are appearing every year. In 2008 Jeffrey Beall, a University of Colorado librarian, developed a list of predatory journals which he updated for several years. 

Naomi Oreskes argues that, "[t]o put an end to predatory practices, universities and other research institutions need to find ways to correct the incentives that lead scholars to prioritize publication quantity... Setting a maximum limit on the number of articles that hiring or funding committees can consider might help... as could placing less importance on the number of citations an author gets. After all, the purpose of science is not merely to produce papers. It is to produce papers that tell us something truthful and meaningful about the world."

See also

 Agnotology
 Cancel culture
 Chinese room
 Demarcation problem
 Denialism
 Economics of science
 Economics of scientific knowledge
 Hard and soft science
 Historiography of science
 History of military technology
 History of science
 History of science policy
 History of technology
 Interdisciplinarity
 Invalid science
 List of examples of Stigler's law
 List of misnamed theorems
 List of scientific misconduct incidents
 Little Science, Big Science
 Matilda effect
 Matthew effect
 Mertonian norms
 Philosophy of science
 Politicization of science
 Pseudoscience
 Publication bias
 Publish or perish
 Replicability
 Replication crisis
 Reproducibility Project
 Role of chance in scientific discoveries
 Science and technology studies
 Science of science policy
 Science studies
 Science, technology and society
 Scientific misconduct
 Scientometrics
 Serendipity
 Sociology of knowledge
 Sociology of science
 Sociology of scientific ignorance
 Sociology of scientific knowledge
 Stigler's law of eponymy
 Technological singularity
 Women in computing
 Women in science
 Women in STEM fields
 Woozle effect
 Workplace bullying in academia

Notes

References

Bibliography

 
 Viviane Callier, "Idea Epidemic: An infectious disease model shows how science knowledge spreads", Scientific American, vol. 320, no. 2 (February 2019), p. 14.
 Andrei Cimpian and Sarah-Jane Leslie, "The Brilliance Trap", Scientific American, vol. 317, no. 3 (September 2017), pp. 60–65.
 Kenneth Cukier, "Ready for Robots? How to Think about the Future of AI", Foreign Affairs, vol. 98, no. 4 (July/August 2019), pp. 192–98.
 Lydia Denworth, "A Significant Problem: Standard scientific methods are under fire. Will anything change?", Scientific American, vol. 321, no. 4 (October 2019), pp. 62–67.
 Pedro Domingos, "Our Digital Doubles: AI will serve our species, not control it", Scientific American, vol. 319, no. 3 (September 2018), pp. 88–93.
 Freeman Dyson, "The Case for Blunders" (review of Mario Livio, Brilliant Blunders: From Darwin to Einstein—Colossal Mistakes by Great Scientists that Changed Our Understanding of Life and the Universe, Simon and Schuster), The New York Review of Books, vol. LXI, no. 4 (March 6, 2014), pp. 4–8.
 The Editors, "Go Public or Perish: When universities discourage scientists from speaking out, society suffers", Scientific American, vol. 318, no. 2 (February 2018), p. 6.
 Ian Frazier, "Grim Reapers" (review of Tom Philpott, Perilous Bounty: The Looming Collapse of American Farming and How We Can Prevent It, Bloomsbury, 2020, 246 pp.; and Sarah Vogel, The Farmer's Lawyer: The North Dakota Nine and the Fight to Save the Family Farm, Bloomsbury, 2021, 407 pp.), The New York Review of Books, vol. LXX, no. 2 (February 9, 2023), pp. 39–42.
 Erica Gies, "The Meaning of Lichen: How a self-taught naturalist unearthed hidden symbioses in the wilds of British Columbia—and helped to overturn 150 years of accepted scientific wisdom", Scientific American, vol. 316, no. 6 (June 2017), pp. 52–59.
 Marcelo Gleiser, "How Much Can We Know? The reach of the scientific method is constrained by the limitations of our tools and the intrinsic impenetrability of some of nature's deepest questions", Scientific American, vol. 318, no. 6 (June 2018), pp. 72–73.
 Aleksander Głowacki, On Discoveries and Inventions: A Public Lecture Delivered on 23 March 1873 by Aleksander Głowacki [Bolesław Prus], Passed by the [Russian] Censor (Warsaw, 21 April 1873), Warsaw, Printed by F. Krokoszyńska, 1873. 
 Brian Greene, interviewed about theoretical physics by Walter Isaacson on PBS' Amanpour & Company, 24 October 2018.
 A. Rupert Hall, Philosophers at War: The Quarrel between Newton and Leibniz, New York, Cambridge University Press, 1980, .
 William A. Haseltine, "What We Learned from AIDS: Lessons from another pandemic for fighting COVID–19", Scientific American, vol. 323, no. 4 (October 2020), pp. 36–41. 
 Jim Holt, "At the Core of Science" (a review of Steven Weinberg, To Explain the World: The Discovery of Modern Science, Harper, 2015), The New York Review of Books, vol. LXII, no. 14 (September 24, 2015), p. 53–54.
 Matthew Hutson, "Ineffective Geniuses?: People with very high IQs can be perceived as worse leaders", Scientific American, vol. 318, no. 3 (March 2018), p. 20.
 John P.A. Ioannidis, "Rethink Funding: The way we pay for science does not encourage the best results" (State of the World's Science, 2018), Scientific American, vol. 319, no. 4 (October 2018), pp. 53–55.
 Steven Johnson, Where Good Ideas Come From: The Natural History of Innovation, New York, Riverhead Books, 2010, .
 Christopher Kasparek, "Prus' Pharaoh: the Creation of a Historical Novel," The Polish Review, vol. XXXIX, no. 1 (1994), pp. 45–50.
 Christopher Kasparek, review of Robert Olby, The Path to the Double Helix (Seattle, University of Washington Press, 1974), in Zagadnienia naukoznawstwa (Logology, or Science of Science), Warsaw, vol. 14, no. 3 (1978), pp. 461–63.
 Q[ing] Ke; et al. (2015). "Defining and identifying Sleeping Beauties in science". Proc. Natl. Acad. Sci. USA 112: 7426–7431. doi:10.1073/pnas.1424329112.
 Thomas S. Kuhn, The Structure of Scientific Revolutions, 1st ed., Chicago, University of Chicago Press, 1962.
 David Lamb and S.M. Easton, Multiple Discovery: The Pattern of Scientific Progress, Amersham, Avebury Press, 1984, .
 Gary Marcus, "Am I Human?: Researchers need new ways to distinguish artificial intelligence from the natural kind", Scientific American, vol. 316, no. 3 (March 2017), pp. 58–63.
 Gary Marcus, "Artificial Confidence: Even the newest, buzziest systems of artificial general intelligence are stymied by the same old problems", Scientific American, vol. 327, no. 4 (October 2022), pp. 42–45.
 Susana Martinez-Conde, Devin Powell and Stephen L. Macknik, "The Plight of the Celebrity Scientist", Scientific American, vol. 315, no. 4 (October 2016), pp. 64–67.
 D.T. Max, "The Numbers King: Algorithms made Jim Simons a Wall Street billionaire. His new research center helps scientists mine data for the common good", The New Yorker, 18 & 25 December 2017, pp. 72–76, 78–83.
 Robert K. Merton, On Social Structure and Science, edited and with an introduction by Piotr Sztompka, University of Chicago Press, 1996.
 Robert K. Merton, The Sociology of Science: Theoretical and Empirical Investigations, Chicago, University of Chicago Press,1973.
 Clara Moskowitz, "End Harassment: A leader of a major report on sexual misconduct explains how to make science accessible to everyone" (State of the World's Science, 2018), Scientific American, vol. 319, no. 4 (October 2018), p. 61.
 Nathan Myhrvold, "Even Genius Needs a Benefactor: Without government resources, basic science will grind to a halt", Scientific American, vol. 314, no. 2 (February 2016), p. 11.
 Thomas Nagel, "Listening to Reason" (a review of T.M. Scanlon, Being Realistic about Reasons, Oxford University Press, 132 pp.), The New York Review of Books, vol. LXI, no. 15 (October 9, 2014), pp. 47–49.
 Naomi Oreskes, "The Appeal of Bad Science: Nonreplicable studies are cited strangely often", Scientific American, vol. 325, no. 2 (August 2021), p. 82. 
 Naomi Oreskes, "Is Science Actually 'Right'?: It doesn't deliver absolute truth, but it contains useful elements of truth", Scientific American, vol. 325, no. 1 (July 2021), p. 78.
 Naomi Oreskes, "Paper Predators: Journals that print shoddy research put people's lives at risk", Scientific American, vol. 326, no. 6 (June 2022), p. 59.
 Naomi Oreskes, "Scientists: Please Speak Plainly", Scientific American, vol. 325, no. 4 (October 2021), p. 88.
 Naomi Oreskes, "Sexism and Racism Persist in Science: We kid ourselves if we insist that the system will magically correct itself", Scientific American, vol. 323, no. 4 (October 2020), p. 81.
 Naomi Oreskes, "Tainted Money Taints Research: How sex offender Jeffrey Epstein bought influence at Harvard University", Scientific American, vol. 323, no. 3 (September 2020), p. 84.
 Maria Ossowska and Stanisław Ossowski, "The Science of Science", reprinted in Bohdan Walentynowicz, ed., Polish Contributions to the Science of Science, Dordrecht, Holland, D. Reidel Publishing Company, 1982, pp. 82–95.
 Shannon Palus, "Make Research Reproducible: Better incentives could reduce the alarming number of studies that turn out to be wrong when repeated" (State of the World's Science, 2018), Scientific American, vol. 319, no. 4 (October 2018), pp. 56–59.
 Claire Pomeroy, "Academia's Gender Problem", Scientific American, vol. 314, no. 1 (January 2016), p. 11.
 Bolesław Prus, On Discoveries and Inventions: A Public Lecture Delivered on 23 March 1873 by Aleksander Głowacki [Bolesław Prus], Passed by the [Russian] Censor (Warsaw, 21 April 1873), Warsaw, Printed by F. Krokoszyńska, 1873. 
 Tori Reeve, Down House: the Home of Charles Darwin, London, English Heritage, 2009.
 Joshua Rothman, "The Rules of the Game: How does science really work?" (review of Michael Strevens, The Knowledge Machine: How Irrationality Created Modern Science, Liveright), The New Yorker, 5 October 2020, pp. 67–71. 
 Melissa A. Schilling, Quirky: The Remarkable Story of the Traits, Foibles, and Genius of Breakthrough Innovators Who Changed the World, New York, Public Affairs, 2018, .
 John R. Searle, "What Your Computer Can't Know" (review of Luciano Floridi, The Fourth Revolution: How the Infosphere Is Reshaping Human Reality, Oxford University Press, 2014; and Nick Bostrom, Superintelligence: Paths, Dangers, Strategies, Oxford University Press, 2014), The New York Review of Books, vol. LXI, no. 15 (October 9, 2014), pp. 52–55.
 Michael Shermer, "Scientia Humanitatis: Reason, empiricism and skepticism are not virtues of science alone", Scientific American, vol. 312, no. 6 (June 2015), p. 80.
 James Somers, "Binary Stars: The friendship that made Google huge", The New York Review of Books, 10 December 2018, pp. 28–35.
 Herbert Spencer, First Principles, part I: "The Unknowable", chapter IV: "The Relativity of All Knowledge", 1862.
 Klemens Szaniawski, "Preface", Polish Contributions to the Science of Science, Dordrecht, Holland, D. Reidel Publishing Company, 1982, pp. VII–X.
 Paul Taylor, "Insanely Complicated, Hopelessly Inadequate" (review of Brian Cantwell Smith, The Promise of Artificial Intelligence: Reckoning and Judgment, MIT, October 2019, 157 pp.; Gary Marcus and Ernest Davis, Rebooting AI: Building Artificial Intelligence We Can Trust, Ballantine, September 2019, 304 pp.; Judea Pearl and Dana Mackenzie, The Book of Why: The New Science of Cause and Effect, Penguin, May 2019, 418 pp.), London Review of Books, vol. 43, no. 2 (21 January 2021), pp. 37–39. 
 Stefan Theil, "Trouble in Mind: Two years in, a $1-billion-plus effort to simulate the human brain is in disarray. Was it poor management, or is something fundamentally wrong with Big Science?", Scientific American, vol. 313, no. 4 (October 2015), pp. 36–42.
 G.W. Trompf, The Idea of Historical Recurrence in Western Thought, from Antiquity to the Reformation, Berkeley, University of California Press, 1979, .
 Bohdan Walentynowicz, ed., Polish Contributions to the Science of Science, Dordrecht, Holland, D. Reidel Publishing Company, 1982, .
 Bohdan Walentynowicz, "Editor's Note", Polish Contributions to the Science of Science, Dordrecht, Holland, D. Reidel Publishing Company, 1982, pp. XI–XII.
 Florian Znaniecki, "The Subject Matter and Tasks of the Science of Knowledge" (English translation), in Bohdan Walentynowicz, ed., Polish Contributions to the Science of Science, Dordrecht, Holland, D. Reidel Publishing Company, 1982, pp. 1–81.
 Harriet Zuckerman, Scientific Elite: Nobel Laureates in the United States, New York, The Free Press, 1977.

Further reading

 Dominus, Susan, "Sidelined: American women have been advancing science and technology for centuries. But their achievements weren't recognized until a tough-minded scholar [Margaret W. Rossiter] hit the road and rattled the academic world", Smithsonian, vol. 50, no. 6 (October 2019), pp. 42–53, 80.
 Finkbeiner, Ann, "Women Take On the Stars: A new wave of astronomers are leading a revolution in scientific culture", Scientific American, vol. 326, no. 4 (April 2022), pp. 32–39.  Women astronomers have been making progress against professional discrimination and sexual harassment toward women.
 Natarajan, Priyamvada, "Calculating Women" (review of Margot Lee Shetterly, Hidden Figures: The American Dream and the Untold Story of the Black Women Mathematicians Who Helped Win the Space Race, William Morrow; Dava Sobel, The Glass Universe: How the Ladies of the Harvard Observatory Took the Measure of the Stars, Viking; and Nathalia Holt, Rise of the Rocket Girls: The Women Who Propelled Us, from Missiles to the Moon to Mars, Little, Brown), The New York Review of Books, vol. LXIV, no. 9 (25 May 2017), pp. 38–39.
 Riskin, Jessica, "Just Use Your Thinking Pump!" (review of Henry M. Cowles, The Scientific Method: An Evolution of Thinking from Darwin to Dewey, Harvard University Press, 372 pp.), The New York Review of Books, vol. LXVII, no. 11 (2 July 2020), pp. 48–50.
 Steven Rose, "Pissing in the Snow" (review of Audra J. Wolfe, Freedom's Laboratory: The Cold War Struggle for the Soul of Science, Johns Hopkins, January 2019, 302 pp.), London Review of Books, vol. 41, no. 14 (18 July 2019), pp. 31–33.
 Scientific American Board of Editors, "Science Suffers from Harassment: A leading organization has said that sexual harassment is scientific misconduct. Where are the others?", Scientific American, vol. 318, no. 3 (March 2018), p. 8.
 Watson, James D., The Double Helix: A Personal Account of the Discovery of the Structure of DNA, New York, Atheneum, 1968.

External links
 American Masters: Decoding Watson - PBS documentary about James Watson, co-discoverer of the structure of DNA, including interviews with Watson, his family, and colleagues. 2019-01-02.

Research
Science policy
Science studies
Scientific method
Sociology of scientific knowledge